A high-speed craft (HSC) is a high-speed water vessel for civilian use, also called a fastcraft or fast ferry. 
The first high-speed craft were often hydrofoils or hovercraft, but in the 1990s catamaran and monohull designs become more popular and large hydrofoils and hovercraft are no longer built.
Most high-speed craft serve as passenger ferries, but the largest catamarans and monohulls also carry cars, buses, large trucks and freight.

In the 1990s there were a variety of builders, but due to HSC high fuel consumption, many shipbuilders have withdrawn from this market so the construction of the largest fast ferries, up to 127 metres, has been consolidated to two Australian companies, Austal of Perth and Incat of Hobart. There is still a wide variety of builders for smaller fast catamaran ferries between 24 and 60 metres.

Hulled designs are often powered by pump-jets coupled to medium-speed diesel engines. Hovercraft are usually powered by gas turbines or diesel engines driving propellers and impellers.

The design and safety of high-speed craft is regulated by the International Convention for the Safety of Life at Sea (SOLAS) Convention, Chapter 10, High-Speed Craft (HSC) Codes of 1994 and 2000, adopted by the Maritime Safety Committee of the International Maritime Organization (IMO).

In accordance with SOLAS Chapter 10 Reg. 1.3, high-speed craft are craft capable of a maximum speed, in metres per second (m/s), equal to or exceeding:

 

where  = volume of displacement in cubic metres corresponding to the design waterline, excluding craft of which the hull is supported clear above the water surface in non-displacement mode by aerodynamic forces generated by ground effect.

HSC examples 

 Alstom Leroux Naval
 
 
 
 Austal
 Auto Express 86-class ferry
 Hawaii Superferry
 
 , world's largest civilian trimaran
 
 
  (Lake Michigan)
 
 
 
 
 Catamaran Ferries International
 PacifiCat-class ferry
 Dakota Creek Industries
 Passenger-Only Fast Ferry-class ferry
 Empresa Nacional Bazán
 HSC Silvia Ana L
 Fincantieri 
 HSC Gotlandia II
 MDV 1200-class fast ferry
 Gladding-Hearn Shipbuilding
 
 IHI Corporation
 SSTH Ocean Arrow
 Incat
 Madiba 1 - operated by falcon Marine 
 , one of three similar 112-metre Incat vessels on this route
 
 HSV-2 Swift
 
 
 Krasnoye Sormovo
 Raketa (hydrofoil)
 Ocean Fast Ferries
 OceanJet 1
 OceanJet 2
 OceanJet 3
 OceanJet 5
 OceanJet 6
 OceanJet 7
 OceanJet 8
 OceanJet 88
 OceanJet 888
 OceanJet 188
 OceanJet 288
 OceanJet 9
 OceanJet 10
 OceanJet 11
 OceanJet 12
 OceanJet 15
 STX Finland 
 Stena Line's HSS 1500
 Supercat
 St. Nuriel
 St. Sealthiel
 St. Emmanuel
 St. Uriel
 St. Jhudiel
 St. Braquiel
 St. Camael
 St. Sariel
 Westermoen Hydrofoil
 Stena Line's HSS 900

See also 
 List of high-speed craft ferry routes
 BGV

References

External links 

 The Merchant Shipping (High-Speed Craft) Regulations 2004

 
Ferry classes